Kevin Harley (born 20 April 1994) is a French basketball player for French Pro B league club Élan Chalon.

References

1994 births
Living people
Boulazac Basket Dordogne players
Élan Chalon players
French men's basketball players
People from Trappes
Poitiers Basket 86 players
Sportspeople from Yvelines